Nongmatang (English: Only One Day) is a 2014 Indian Meitei language film directed by Suvas E. and produced by Ajit Yumnam and Brojen Yumnam, under the banner of Cultural Society Khuman Maheikol and presented by Skyline Pictures. It stars Kaiku Rajkumar, Abenao Elangbam and Prity Maibam in the lead, with Binitia, Ashokumar, Geetchandra, Puinabati, Priya, Nando Sharma, Brojendrakumar, Somorendro and many others playing supporting roles. The story of the film was written by Ajit Yumnam. Nongmatang got selection at the 3rd Delhi International Film Festival 2014.

Synopsis
The film narrates the story of a girl Mangaleima who stood second position in the HSLCE (High School Leaving Certificate Examination), Manipur. The film starts with Mangaleima explaining to media on how she became successful and was able to stand in the second position. She is supported well by her teachers and friends from school, Chinglen, Tampha and Thaja, particularly teacher Chinglen, who doesn't believe in the habit of students taking up private tuitions, which is increasingly becoming a fashion in the present-day Manipur.

Cast
 Kaiku Rajkumar as Sir Chinglen
 Abenao Elangbam as Madam Tampha
 Prity Maibam as Mangaleima
 Binitia Devi as Thaja
 Ashokumar Chongtham as Khuman Maheikol's Principal
 Geetchandra Chongtham as Thaja's Father
 Puinabati
 Priya
 Nando Sharma
 Brojendrakumar
 Somorendro

Accolades
Nongmatang won many awards at the Sahitya Seva Samiti Awards 2015, including the Best Feature Film Award. The movie also bagged 4 awards at the 9th Manipur State Film Awards 2014.

Soundtrack
Gopi and A.K. Yangoi composed the soundtrack for the film and Ajit Yumnam wrote the lyrics. The song is titled Taibang Meerol Amatta Tadringeido.

References

2010s Meitei-language films
2014 films